Kaveh Afagh (born May 1, 1983) is an Iranian singer, songwriter, arranger, guitarist as well as an actor and painter.

Career
Afagh learned to play classical guitar as a child. By age 15, he knew how to play the electric guitar, and became interested in rock music. He began composing his own songs, completing several pieces by age 17.
In 2010, Afagh won the 2nd Underground World Music Festival with his song Ghesseye Zirzamin, which featured Yas and Arad Aria. He received the Best Performance Award in the Contemporary Music category at the 5th Iranian Resistance Festival in 2012. In 2017, Afagh published the first Persian rock songbook, Tehran – 57.
Afagh is also the founder of band The Ways. With them, he has composed several songs for Iranian plays and movies.

Afagh is the first rock singer in post-Islamic Revolution Iran to obtain an activity license, which he obtained after being banned for ten years from performing. He remains one of the country's most prominent rock singers.

Aside from his music, Afagh has also exhibited his artwork in several art galleries. His artwork is influenced by music and social issues.

Discography

Albums
Stress – 2010
Dances with Pills – 2016
Shawl – 2018
Lotus – 2019

References

External links

1983 births
Living people
Iranian musicians
Iranian rock musicians
Iranian rock singers
Musicians from Tehran
Singers from Tehran
Persian-language singers
Iranian composers
Iranian guitarists
Iranian music arrangers
21st-century Iranian male singers
Iranian singer-songwriters
Iranian male singers
People from Tehran